Vadu Izei (or Vad) is a commune in Maramureș County, Maramureș, Romania. The commune is composed of two villages, Vadu Izei and Valea Stejarului (until 1960 Valea Porcului; Disznópataka).

The commune lies on the banks of the river Iza. It is located in the northern part of the county, close to the border with Ukraine.

References

Communes in Maramureș County
Localities in Romanian Maramureș